The Wariangga, also written Warriyangka, are an Aboriginal Australian people of the Gascoyne region in Western Australia.

Language
The Warriyangka spoke one of four dialects of Mantharta, the other members of the dialect continuum being the Thiin, Djiwarli and Tharrkari.

Country
Tindale states also that they held to a strict maintenance of boundaries. Their neighbours were the Tenma to the north, the Dyiwali to their northeast, the Ninanu directly east, the Watjarri southeast, the Malgaru at their southern limits, and the Tharrkari due west.

Social organization
The Wariangga did not practice circumcision. Their marriage system was described by Daisy Bates.

Alternative names
 Wariengga, Warianga, Warienga, Warrijangga
 Wariwongga, Wari-wonga, Warriwonga
 Woorienga, Woorenga

Source :

Notes

Citations

Sources

Aboriginal peoples of Western Australia
Gascoyne